Edward Augustus may refer to:

 Prince Edward, Duke of York and Albany (1739–1767)
 Prince Edward, Duke of Kent and Strathearn (1767–1820)
 Edward M. Augustus Jr. (born 1965), American politician and administrator in Massachusetts